The Chawathil First Nation or Chawathil Indian Band is a band government of the Sto:lo people located in the Upper Fraser Valley region near Hope, British Columbia, Canada.  They are a member government of the Stó:lō Tribal Council.  They are the operators of the Telte-yet Campground, which is on the banks of the Fraser in downtown Hope.

Reserves
Their main reserve Chawathil 4 is located by Katz, a station of the Canadian Pacific Railway.  It comprises almost 90% of their total landbase of 614.1 ha (1517 acres).

Hope 1, 3.9 ha (9.6 acres)
Schkam 2, 54.3 ha (134.1 acres)
Greenwood Island 3, 4.0 ha. (9.9 acres)
Chawathil 4, 551.0 ha. (1361.0 acres)
Tunnel 6, 0.9 ha (2.2 acres)

References

Sto:lo governments
First Nations governments in the Lower Mainland